Legion of Mary can refer to several things;

Legion of Mary, a Catholic association founded in Dublin
Legio Maria, a new religious movement in Kenya
Legion of Mary (band), an American rock band
Legion of Mary: The Jerry Garcia Collection, Vol. 1, an album